Metzar is an Israeli settlement organized as a kibbutz in the southern Golan Heights. The settlement was established as a kibbutz after Israel occupied the area in the Six Day War in 1967. The 29th settlement on the Golan Heights, it falls under the jurisdiction of Golan Regional Council.

The international community considers Israeli settlements in the Golan Heights illegal under international law, but the Israeli government disputes this.

See also
 Israeli-occupied territories

References

Israeli settlements in the Golan Heights
Kibbutzim
Populated places established in 1981
Golan Regional Council
Nahal settlements
Populated places in Northern District (Israel)
1981 establishments in the Israeli Military Governorate